Denis O'Sullivan may refer to:
Denis J. O'Sullivan (1918–1987), Irish politician
Denis O'Sullivan (golfer) (born 1948), Irish golfer
Denis O'Sullivan (Gaelic footballer) (born 1989), Cork Gaelic footballer

See also
Dennis O'Sullivan (disambiguation)